Lassy Mbouity,(born 15 October 1988) in Brazzaville, is a Congolese writer, historian and journalist. Managing director of Congo-Brazzaville Information newspaper, he has published books on African history.

Biography 
Lassy Mbouity was born into a poor family from Pointe-Noire, the economic capital of the Republic of Congo with a population of over 715,334 inhabitants. He is a native of the Kingdom of Loango which was a pre-colonial state on the coast of Central Africa, founded at the turn of the fifteenth century and abolished in 1885. He went to College Lycée Victor Augagneur in Pointe-Noire where he spent his childhood and studied English in the United States of America.

Career
Lassy Mbouity was one of the most popular community leaders in Africa and Congo for organizing campaigns for young people across Africa, in order to educate the new generation. 
After publishing the book Africa after Asia in 2009, this Congolese writer has indeed stored behind the Europeen Economical strategy. In June 2008, Mbouity was appointed as the General Secretary of the Congolese Student Association in West Africa (Association des élèves et étudiants Congolais), and claimed to be economically free by promising to keep defending the interests of the Congolese people in his books, but also those of young, which remains one of the mainstays. Mbouity makes regular visits to the French president François Hollande and American political leaders such as Rand Paul.

Mbouity, through its accompanying program of youth education, attempts to provide boys and girls with the essential knowledge to become informed educators. The latter will be able to ensure the education of future generations and offer Africa a promising future.

Community Organizing

Through his organization, Lassy Mbouity tried to demonstrate why the revolution of education is very important in Africa. He said during an interview in Benin that from the time when African traditions are giving way to civilization through colonization that has been very positive and less negative for Africans, the transmission of knowledge is the most important for the future of Africa.

Mbouity Lassy is an active member of the Congolese Party of Labour, founded in 1969 by former President Marien Ngouabi. In his book African Engaged or Disaged he stated that: African presidents in general should make an effort to invest in the next generation of young African leaders. One of my peculiarities is to transfer life skills to young Africans so that they can change their present and get a better future.

Publications
Lassy Mbouity is the main author of several books published in French around the world.

 Révolution de l'éducation africaine
 L'Afrique après l'Asie
 François Hollande Réveille la Jeunnesse Africaine
 Histoire de la République du Congo
 Histoire de la République démocratique du Congo
 Histoire de la République du Tchad
 Autonomisation politique de la jeunesse africaine
 Histoire de la République Gabonaise
 Histoire de la République Centrafricaine
 Histoire de la République de Guinée
 Histoire de la République de Côte d’Ivoire
 Histoire de la République du Mali
 Histoire de la République du Sénégal
 Histoire de la République de Madagascar
 Histoire de l'Afrique
 Denis Sassou Nguesso, ma politique pour le Congo
 La lutte contre la corruption et les conflits d'intérêts en Afrique
 Mon projet de société pour la République du Congo: Un Congo uni dans la diversité
 Histoire de la République du Cameroun

References

External links

 BnF
 Virtual International Authority File
 WorldCat

1988 births
Living people
Republic of the Congo writers
African and Black nationalists
Republic of the Congo humanitarians